Seaton Hall and Seaton Court are the names of two parts of one sprawling building on the campus of Kansas State University. The building is set just north of the Student Union and Bosco Plaza.

Renovations

In 1999 the East wing underwent major renovations as part of a three-phase project. The architecture and planning firm Ebert Mayo Design Group was responsible for the plans. This phase cost $4.1 million and includes:
 22 Design Studios
 4 Classrooms
 4 Critique Rooms
 Atrium/Display Gallery
 Technology Infrastructure
 New environmental systems

Sources
 Information and History of Seaton Hall and Kansas State University
 Current news of what is happening in the College
 The Ebert Mayo Design Group site with images of plans and finished construction
 K-State Department of Facilities Planning Archives

External links
 College of Architecture Planning and Design Homepage
 Department of Architectural Engineering and Construction Science (College of Engineering) Homepage

Kansas State University academic buildings
Architecture schools in Kansas
Landscape architecture schools
1908 establishments in Kansas
University and college buildings completed in 1908